Sunny Rana (born 25 December 1987) is an Indian cricketer. He made his List A debut for Uttarakhand in the 2018–19 Vijay Hazare Trophy on 20 September 2018. He made his first-class debut for Uttarakhand in the 2018–19 Ranji Trophy on 1 November 2018. He made his Twenty20 debut for Uttarakhand in the 2018–19 Syed Mushtaq Ali Trophy on 21 February 2019.

References

External links
 

1987 births
Living people
Indian cricketers
Uttarakhand cricketers
Place of birth missing (living people)